The 1999 World Interuniversity Games were the first edition of the Games (organised by IFIUS), and were held in Antwerp, Belgium.

External links
 Homepage IFIUS

World Interuniversity Games
World Interuniversity Games
World Interuniversity Games
International sports competitions hosted by Belgium
Multi-sport events in Belgium
Sports competitions in Antwerp
April 1999 sports events in Europe
1990s in Antwerp